Robas Mongkol is a khum (commune) of Moung Ruessei District in Battambang Province in north-western Cambodia.

Villages

 Boeng Bei
 Kuoy Chik Dei
 Preaek Am
 Koun K'aek Muoy
 Koun K'aek Pir
 Robas Mongkol
 Anlong Koub
 Prey Prum Muoy
 Prey Prum Pir

References

Communes of Battambang province
Moung Ruessei District